Errigal Ciarán GAC is a Gaelic Athletic Association Gaelic football club in southern County Tyrone, Northern Ireland. It represents the parish of the same name, which incorporates the village of Ballygawley and its surrounding area. The club was founded in its current guise in 1990, succeeding the Ballygawley St Ciaran's club which represented the parish from the 1920s until the 1980s.

History
From 1928 until 1982, the parish of Errigal Ciarán was represented by Ballygawley St Ciaran's.  The club's reformation as Errigal Ciarán in 1990 gave rise to an era of unprecedented success over the next two decades, with the club's most recent success coming in 2022 when they captured their 8th Tyrone Senior Football Championship.  The club has also produced many illustrious players, such as Peter Canavan and the former Tyrone manager, Mickey Harte, who started his managerial career guiding Errigal to Ulster Championship success. Errigal Ciarán are the only club team in Tyrone to win the Ulster Senior Club Football Championship, with two championship successes to date, in 1993 and 2002.

The Club are also represented in the Tyrone ACL Div 3 by a Junior (Thirds) team and in the Tyrone Ladies' senior football league Division 1.
The clubs men's Junior team entered the Tyrone ACL at the beginning of the 2007 Season, having previously represented the club in memorial and friendly tournaments around Ulster.  This team have reached the Tyrone Junior championship Semi Final on one occasion (2011) and followed this up with their most successful league campaign to date in 2012, reaching the promotion playoffs.  Their continued presence and ability to compete in Tyrone Junior Football is testament to the great popularity of Gaelic Football within the parish.  The club's senior ladies' team play in Tyrone's top flight.  They have won the Tyrone senior championship title on two occasions, in 2007 when they went on to win the Ulster Ladies' senior club football championship, and more recently in 2012 when they defeated a highly fancied Carrickmore side.

Achievements
 Tyrone Senior Football Championship (8)
  1993, 1994, 1997, 2000, 2002, 2006, 2012, 2022
 Ulster Senior Club Football Championship (2) 
 1993, 2002

Notable players
 Pascal Canavan
 Peter Canavan
 John Devine
 David Harte
 Peter Harte
 Cormac McGinley
 Enda McGinley
 Malachy O'Rourke, who transferred to Errigal Ciarán

References

External links
 Official Errigal Ciarán GAA Club website

Gaelic football clubs in County Tyrone
Gaelic games clubs in County Tyrone